Vélingara Arrondissement  is the only arrondissement of the Ranérou Ferlo Department in the Matam Region of east Senegal.

Subdivisions
The arrondissement is divided administratively into rural communities and in turn into villages.

Arrondissements of Senegal
Matam Region